The 1930 Kategoria e Dytë was the first season of the second tier of football in Albania. It was contested by 5 teams and Muzaka Berat were crowned champions and Bardhyli Lezhë finished in second place.

Teams

Muzaka Berat won the competition

Winning team
Muzaka Berat

 Llaki Bufi (GK)
 Loni Qytyqy (GK)
 Petraq Tusha (GK)
 Xhavit Agolli
 Hajdar Cakrani
 Luan Dibra
 Mimi Felau
 Vasil Kajana
 Fiqiri Nuri
 Taqi Nushi
 Sulejman Protopapa
 Alqiviadhi Shyti
 Vangjel Veveçka
 Lilo Xhimitiku
Coach: Jani Kosta (player-manager)

References

Kategoria e Parë seasons
Albania
Albania
2